The 1975 World Junior Curling Championships were held from February 25 to March 1 at the East York Curling Club in East York, Ontario, Canada. The tournament only consisted of a men's event.

Teams

Round robin

  Team to final
  Teams to semifinal

Playoffs

Final standings

Awards
 WJCC Sportsmanship Award:  Claude Feige

All-Star Team:
Skip:  Robb King
Third:  Brad Hannah
Second:  Anders Grahn
Lead:  Chris King

References

1975 in Toronto
Curling in Toronto
1975 in Canadian curling
World Junior Curling Championships
International curling competitions hosted by Canada
February 1975 sports events in Canada
March 1975 sports events in Canada
1975 in youth sport